Mikhail Dmitriyevich Vekovishchev (born 5 August 1998) is a Russian swimmer.

He competed at the 2018 European Aquatics Championships, winning the silver medal in both 4×200 m men's freestyle relay and 4×200 m mixed freestyle relay events.

References

1998 births
Living people
Russian male freestyle swimmers
European Aquatics Championships medalists in swimming
Universiade silver medalists for Russia
Universiade bronze medalists for Russia
Universiade medalists in swimming
World Aquatics Championships medalists in swimming
People from Obninsk
European Games competitors for Russia
Swimmers at the 2015 European Games
Medalists at the 2017 Summer Universiade
Swimmers at the 2020 Summer Olympics
Medalists at the 2020 Summer Olympics
Olympic silver medalists for the Russian Olympic Committee athletes
Olympic silver medalists in swimming
Sportspeople from Kaluga Oblast